Jerry Hansen is a former racing driver.

Jerry Hansen may also refer to:

Jerry Hansen (musician), Ghanaian highlife musician